Calliostoma gordanum is a species of sea snail, a marine gastropod mollusk in the family Calliostomatidae.

Description
The height of the shell attains 25 mm.

Distribution
This marine species occurs off Baja California, Mexico.

References

External links
 To Encyclopedia of Life
 To USNM Invertebrate Zoology Mollusca Collection
 To ITIS
 To World Register of Marine Species
 

gordanum
Gastropods described in 1970